Gadi Ado (born 14 June 1940) is a Ugandan sprinter. He competed in the men's 400 metres at the 1960 Summer Olympics. Ado competed in the 440 yards at the 1962 British Empire and Commonwealth Games, not progressing past the heats.

References

1940 births
Living people
Athletes (track and field) at the 1960 Summer Olympics
Ugandan male sprinters
Olympic athletes of Uganda
Athletes (track and field) at the 1962 British Empire and Commonwealth Games
Commonwealth Games competitors for Uganda
People from Arua District